Jane Cox (born 13 May 1952) is an English actress, known for her role as Lisa Dingle in the ITV soap opera Emmerdale, a role she portrayed from 1996 to 2019 and again briefly in 2020. In 2011, she was nominated for the British Soap Award for Best Actress for her portrayal.

Career 
Cox has starred in episodes of Coronation Street, Hetty Wainthropp Investigates and The Bill. Her most notable pre-Emmerdale role was playing JJ in the children's entertainment series Allsorts from 1991 to 1995. She has also appeared on Lily Savage's Blankety Blank.

In March 2019, Cox announced that she would be leaving Emmerdale after 23 years of portraying Lisa Dingle. She made her final physical appearance on 24 May 2019, but made a voiceover appearance on 6 June 2019 in a farewell to her character. However, Cox briefly reprised the role for several voice cameos over the course of October and November 2020.

Filmography

Awards and nominations

References

External links 
 

1952 births
Living people
English television actresses
English soap opera actresses